"Montana" is the regional anthem of the U.S. state of Montana. It was written by Charles Cohan and composed by Joseph E. Howard and was adopted as the state song on February 20, 1945.

Lyrics
 Tell me of that Treasure State,
 Story always new,
 Tell of its beauties grand
 And its hearts so true.
 Mountains of sunset fire
 The land I love the best
 Let me grasp the hand of one
 From out the golden West

 Montana, Montana, Glory of the West
 Of all the states from coast to coast, You're easily the best
 Montana, Montana, Where skies are always blue
 M-O-N-T-A-N-A 
 Montana I love you!

 Each country has its flower;
 Each one plays a part,
 Each bloom brings a longing hope
 To some lonely heart.
 Bitterroot to me is dear
 Growing in my land
 Sing then that glorious air
 The one I understand.

 Montana, Montana, Glory of the West
 Of all the states from coast to coast, You're easily the best
 Montana, Montana, Where skies are always blue
 M-O-N-T-A-N-A 
 Montana I love you!'''

External links 
 Song history by Travel Montana

Songs about Montana
Montana culture
Montana 1945
Music of Montana